Chasquitambo (Quechua: Chaskitampu) is a location in the Peruvian Bolognesi Province located in the Ancash Region. It is the seat of the Colquioc District.

Populated places in the Ancash Region